Erich Rutemöller (born 8 February 1945) is a German retired football manager and player.

Coaching career
Rutemöller has headed 1. FC Köln, Hansa Rostock and Bonner SC during his coaching career. He was an assistant coach for the Germany national from 1994 to 2004 and served as interim coach from 1996 to 97. He served as a motivational speaker and football coach trainer for aspiring managers attempting to receive their coaching license from the German Football Association. In 2008, he became assistant coach to head coach Ali Daei at the Iran national team.

On 28 March 2009, Rutemöller was appointed temporary head coach of the Iran national team, after Daei's dismissal.
After Afshin Ghotbi became the Iranian National Team head coach, Rutemöller's coaching days for Team Melli finished.

On 27 May 2009, Rutemöller voided his contract with the Football Federation Islamic Republic of Iran and joined Esteghlal FC as first assistant to work with the newly appointed head coach Samad Marfavi on a one-year contract.

In 2011, the Philippine Football Federation appointed Rutemöller as advisor to the U23 national team. His position involved him overseeing the training and formation of the squad as they prepared for the 2011 Southeast Asian Games in Indonesia.

On 26 March 2014, Rutemöller became manager of Afghanistan national team, signing a two-year contract.

Career statistics

Coach

References

1945 births
Living people
People from Steinfurt (district)
Sportspeople from Münster (region)
German footballers
1. FC Köln players
German football managers
1. FC Köln managers
FC Hansa Rostock managers
Bundesliga managers
Bonner SC managers
German expatriate football managers
Expatriate football managers in Iran
Iran national football team managers
Expatriate football managers in Afghanistan
Afghanistan national football team managers
Association footballers not categorized by position
Footballers from North Rhine-Westphalia
German expatriate sportspeople in Iran
German expatriate sportspeople in Afghanistan
FC Eintracht Rheine players
West German football managers
West German footballers